The Old Governor's Mansion, also known as Lieutenant Governor's Mansion, is located at 420 High Street, Frankfort, Kentucky. It is reputed to be the oldest official executive residence officially still in use in the United States, as the mansion is the official residence of the lieutenant governor of Kentucky.

In 1796, the Kentucky General Assembly appropriated funds to provide a house to accommodate the governor. Construction was completed in 1798.  The home barely survived fires and neglect through the years.  It has undergone several style changes as evidenced by some Victorian design elements that were added.

The Mansion was often referred to as the "Palace" in its early days. Dignitaries including Theodore Roosevelt, Andrew Jackson, Louis-Philippe of France, Henry Clay, William Jennings Bryan and the Marquis de Lafayette have been guests of the Mansion. The last occupants of the mansion were Lieutenant Governor Steve Henry and his wife Heather French Henry. Since Henry, Lieutenant Governors have chosen not to live in the mansion but to maintain residences in their hometowns and travel to Frankfort as needed. Because of this, the mansion has been turned over to the Kentucky Historical Society.

Both a bricklayer and stonemason who helped build the house, Robert P. Letcher and Thomas Metcalf, later became governors and lived there.

It was listed on the National Register of Historic Places in 1971.

See also
 State House (Pennsylvania): former official residence of the Lt. Governor of Pennsylvania
 List of buildings constructed by Thomas Metcalfe

References

Further reading

External links
 Old Governor's Mansion

Houses in Frankfort, Kentucky
National Register of Historic Places in Frankfort, Kentucky
Houses completed in 1798
Houses on the National Register of Historic Places in Kentucky
Georgian architecture in Kentucky
Tourist attractions in Franklin County, Kentucky
Government buildings completed in 1798
1798 establishments in Kentucky
Kentucky
Governor of Kentucky
State lieutenant governors of the United States
Thomas Metcalfe buildings
Stone houses in Kentucky
Official residences in the United States